The 2016 Georgetown Hoyas football team represented Georgetown University as a member of the Patriot League during the 2016 NCAA Division I FCS football season. They were led by third-year head coach Rob Sgarlata and played their home games at Cooper Field. Georgetown finished the season 3–8 overall and 0–6 in Patriot League play to place last out of seven teams.

Schedule

Game summaries

Davidson

at Marist

Columbia

at Harvard

Princeton

Lehigh

at Fordham

at Lafayette

Holy Cross

Bucknell

at Colgate

References

Georgetown
Georgetown Hoyas football seasons
Georgetown Hoyas football